Jonathan Grady Howe (born February 15, 1994) is an American soccer player.

Career
Howe played college soccer at UCLA between 2012 and 2015.

Howe signed with United Soccer League club Orange County Blues on February 26, 2016.

References

External links
 

1994 births
Living people
American soccer players
UCLA Bruins men's soccer players
Orange County SC players
Soccer players from California
USL Championship players
Association football midfielders
USL League Two players
FC Golden State Force players
Sportspeople from Newport Beach, California